What Lies Before Us is a comedic play by Morris Panych. It takes place in the Canadian Rocky Mountains in 1884, where a railway survey team, Keating and Ambrose, and their Chinese servant Wing, are stranded after being abandoned by their wilderness guide.  The play was a 2007 nominee for the Governor General's Award for English-language drama.

Keating and Ambrose argue over what to do - winter approaches and their food supply is dwindling. Ambrose eventually decides to go for help, but an avalanche injures his leg and traps them. Ambrose learns that Keating has contracted rabies from a squirrel, and that he himself has gangrene on his injured leg. While Keating remains optimistic even after becoming paralyzed, Ambrose loses hope. Ultimately, both Keating and Ambrose die, and Wing is left alone to deliver a monologue in Chinese.

The premiere tour of What Lies Before Us featured:
 Director: Jim Millan
 Keating: Matthew MacFadzean
 Ambrose: David Storch
 Wing: Wayne Sujo

References

Sources
 
 

Plays by Morris Panych
2007 plays
Plays set in Canada
Period pieces
Comedy plays
Fiction set in 1884